John Auchard is a professor of English at the University of Maryland, College Park.

Publications 

 Four Trials  (Simon & Schuster 2003) (co-written with Senator John Edwards)
 The Portable Henry James. New Edition  (Penguin 2004)
  (editor) Graham Greene, Monsignor Quixote  (Penguin 2008)
  (editor) Graham Greene, The Captain and the Enemy  (Penguin 2005)
  (editor) Henry James, Italian Hours  (Penn State Press 1992; Penguin 1995)
 Silence in Henry James: The Heritage of Symbolism and Decadence  (Penn State Press 1986)
 Articles in American Literature: 1968-1975  (collaboration with Lewis Leary)  (Duke 1980)
 American Literature: A Study and Research Guide (collaboration with Lewis Leary)  (St. Martins 1976)
 Travel writing for The Washington Post.

References

Living people
University of Maryland, College Park faculty
American academics of English literature
Year of birth missing (living people)